Janolus longidentatus, the medallion silvertip nudibranch, is a spectacular-looking species of nudibranch, or sea slug. It is a marine gastropod mollusc in the family Proctonotidae.

Apart from striking differences in the egg ribbons, individuals of this species are externally not distinguishable from the Cape silvertip nudibranch.

Distribution
This species is endemic to the South African coast and is found on both sides of the Cape Peninsula, from the intertidal border to at least 30 m.

Description
The medallion silvertip nudibranch grows up to 40mm in total length. It is a pale-bodied nudibranch with dark- to tan-coloured cerata with white tips. Its rhinophores are white and rolled. They are separated from one another by an opaque white spherical mass of unknown function called the rhinophoral crest.

Ecology
This species of nudibranch feeds on a bryozoan, the spiral moss animal, Menipea triseriata. The egg mass is a flat spiral of capsules with 5-7 eggs per capsule. The egg ribbon of the Cape silvertip nudibranch is globular, convoluted and has numerous eggs per capsule.

References

External links

Proctonotidae
Gastropods described in 1981